Resurrection Day is the 25th studio album by German heavy metal band Rage, released on 17 September 2021 through SPV/Steamhammer. It's the first Rage album with a new line-up featuring two guitarists, Jean Bormann and Stefan Weber, making it the band's first album as a quartet since Ghosts. Videos were made for the singles "Virginity" and "Monetary Gods".

Track listing

Personnel

 Peter "Peavy" Wagner – vocals, bass
 Jean Bormann - guitars, backing vocals
 Stefan Weber - guitars
 Vassilios "Lucky" Maniatopoulos - drums, backing vocals

References 

2021 albums
Rage (German band) albums
SPV/Steamhammer albums